The table below lists the judgments of the Constitutional Court of South Africa delivered in 1999.

The members of the court at the start of 1999 were President Arthur Chaskalson, Deputy President Pius Langa, and judges Lourens Ackermann, Richard Goldstone, Johann Kriegler, Tholie Madala, Yvonne Mokgoro, Kate O'Regan, Albie Sachs and Zak Yacoob. The seat left vacant by the death of John Didcott in October 1998 was filled in August by the appointment of Sandile Ngcobo.

References
 
 

1999
Constitutional Court
Constitutional Court of South Africa